The Bishop of Wakefield is an episcopal title which takes its name after the city of Wakefield in West Yorkshire, England. The title was first created for a diocesan bishop in 1888, but it was dissolved in 2014. The Bishop of Wakefield is now an area bishop who has oversight of an episcopal area in the Diocese of Leeds.

The area Bishop of Wakefield is one of the area bishops of the Diocese of Leeds in the Province of York. The Bishop of Wakefield has oversight of the archdeaconry of Pontefract, which consists of the deaneries of Barnsley, Pontefract, and Wakefield. As well as being the area bishop for the Wakefield Episcopal Area, Robinson also provides alternative episcopal oversight for the Diocese of Leeds as a whole, administering to those parishes in the diocese which reject the ministry of priests who are women.

The area bishop's residence is Pontefract House, Wakefield. The current area Bishop of Wakefield is Tony Robinson, who has previously been the suffragan Bishop of Pontefract until that see was translated (renamed) to Wakefield in 2015.

The Bishop of Pontefract was an episcopal title used by a suffragan bishop of the Church of England Dioceses of Wakefield and then of Leeds, in the Province of York, England. The title took its name after the town of Pontefract in West Yorkshire; the See was erected under the Suffragans Nomination Act 1888 by Order in Council dated 27 October 1930. In the Wakefield diocese, the Bishop of Pontefract was the suffragan bishop for the diocese as a whole but primarily had alternative episcopal oversight for those parishes which rejected the ministry of priests who were women; Robinson now fulfils this role for the new diocese.

Following the creation of the Diocese of Leeds on 20 April 2014, the see was eventually renamed to become the suffragan see for the area Bishop of Wakefield. To that end the General Synod approved a petition from the Bishop of Leeds in February 2015; that petition was approved by the Queen-in-Council on 19 March 2015 and so the see was translated to Wakefield.

Tony Robinson continues in the same See, becoming the area Bishop of Wakefield.

List of bishops

References

External links
 Crockford's Clerical Directory - Listings

Wakefield area
 
Bishops of Wakefield area
Wakefield, area Bishop of
 
Pontefract, Bishop of
Anglican suffragan bishops in Wakefield
Bishop of Pontefract